Double Adventure is a 1921 American film serial directed by W. S. Van Dyke. The film is considered to be lost in the United States. All or parts of the serial are held by Gosfilmofond, Russian State Archive.

Cast
 Charles Hutchison as Bob Cross / Dick Biddle
 Josie Sedgwick as Martha Steadman
 Carl Stockdale as Jules Fernol
 S.E. Jennings as Rebel Chief
 Ruth Langdon as Vincente Garcia (credited as Ruth Langston)
 Louis D'Or as President Garcia

See also
 List of American films of 1921
 List of film serials
 List of film serials by studio

References

External links

1921 films
American silent feature films
American black-and-white films
Pathé Exchange film serials
Films directed by W. S. Van Dyke
1920s American films